is a kaiju from Toho's Godzilla franchise who first appeared in Godzilla vs. Gigan. Gigan is a space monster resembling a species of reptile who was turned into a cyborg by the Nebulans. Gigan sports a huge buzzsaw in its frontal abdominal region and large metallic hooks for hands. Gigan is considered one of Godzilla's most brutal and violent opponents, and the first kaiju in the Toho sci-fi series to make him bleed. Complex listed the character as No. 2 on its "The 15 Most Badass Kaiju Monsters of All Time" list.

Overview
Gigan debuts in the 1972 film Godzilla vs. Gigan, in which it and King Ghidorah are summoned to Earth by the M Space Hunter Nebula aliens, insect-like aliens whose planet had been ravaged by another race and wish to subjugate the Earth in order to create a utopia of "perfect peace". However, the monsters are challenged and defeated by Godzilla and Anguirus. In the 1973 film, Godzilla vs. Megalon, Gigan is sent by the Nebulans to assist the people of Seatopia in their assault on humanity by aiding their god, Megalon, in a battle against Godzilla and Jet Jaguar. After having its arm broken by Jet Jaguar however, Gigan retreats into space, leaving Megalon to face Godzilla and Jet Jaguar alone. In the same year, Gigan also makes an appearance in Toho's television series Zone Fighter. After his battle with Godzilla and Jet Jaguar, Gigan is captured by aliens called the Garogans and sent back to Earth to prevent Godzilla from rescuing Zone Fighter. It was temporarily defeated by the former, but revived once Godzilla left and faced Zone Fighter, who eventually killed Gigan.

After a 31-year absence, Gigan returned in the film Godzilla: Final Wars. Millennia prior, it had fought Mothra for the fate of the Earth and was defeated. In the present, its mummified body is discovered in Hokkaido and revealed to be a weapon used by the alien Xiliens, who awaken Gigan to assist them in destroying Earth and destroy the flying battleship the Gotengo to stop its human occupants from awakening Godzilla. While the cyborg disables the battleship, the crew succeed. Gigan faces Godzilla in battle, but is defeated. The Xiliens recover and upgrade Gigan with new weapons to assist Monster X in fighting Godzilla and Mothra. Gigan faces Mothra once more and seemingly kills her, but inadvertently decapitates itself with its razor disks before a burning Mothra destroys it.

Development
Created during the early 1970s, when the Godzilla films had undergone a comic book-like shift both in tone and special effects and were now purely science fiction fare, budgets were greatly reduced, so Gigan was designed as both a marketing ploy for children's toys and as a completely alien creature whose design would not have necessitated the same attention to detail needed for Godzilla's previously more earthly opponents.

The character was first conceived by Kaoru Mabuchi in his script Godzilla vs. the Space Monsters – Earth Defense Directive, which contained elements that would later be incorporated into Godzilla vs. Gigan, including having a mind-controlled Gigan teaming up with King Ghidorah, though the script also included Megalon and the mastermind behind the space monsters' actions was a living brain called Miko.

The first Gigan suit was designed by illustrator Takayoshi Mizuki, modeled by suitmaker Noboyuki Yasamaru, and was worn by Kenpachiro Satsuma, who had starred as Hedorah's suit actor in Godzilla vs. Hedorah the year previously. The two initially did not get on well during filming, as Yasamaru focused more on the suit's appearance than on its practicality, at one point making the character's hand-hooks out of pure fiberglass, which made lifting them almost impossible. In portraying Gigan, Satsuma deliberately emphasized the character's destructive personality. For Gigan's appearance in Zone Fighter, Satsuma did not reprise the role. Special effects director Teruyoshi Nakano had initially wanted to give Gigan the ability to fire a laser beam from its forehead in homage to Buddhist art depicting the Buddha sporting a halo around his head, but the idea was scrapped, as Nakano felt that the character was already powerful enough. The beam was nevertheless included in some promotional stills, along with various Godzilla video games.

Characteristics
Gigan possesses an integrated jet pack to fly, a circular saw in his abdomen, and hooked blades in place of hands. 

In Zone Fighter, the tips of the hooks were able to release an explosive charge on contact with an enemy. 

The Godzilla: Final Wars version has grappling hooks in his arms, a plier at the end of his tail, and can shoot boomerang circular saw blades from his neck and a laser from his eyes. Later the Xiliens replaced his hooks with double-bladed chainsaws.

Appearances

Films
 Godzilla vs. Gigan (1972)
 Godzilla vs. Megalon (1973)
 Godzilla: Final Wars (2004)

Television
 Zone Fighter (1973)
 Godzilla Island (1997–1998)

Web content
 Godziban (2019-present)
 Godzilla vs. Gigan Rex (2022)
 Fest Godzilla 3: Gigan Attacks (2022)

Video games
 Godzilla: Monster of Monsters (NES – 1988)
 Kaijū-ō Godzilla / King of the Monsters, Godzilla (Game Boy – 1993)
 Godzilla: Battle Legends (Turbo Duo – 1993)
 Godzilla: Monster War / Godzilla: Destroy All Monsters (Super Famicom – 1994)
 Godzilla Giant Monster March (Game Gear – 1995)
 Godzilla Trading Battle (PlayStation – 1998)
 Godzilla: Destroy All Monsters Melee (GameCube, Xbox – 2002/2003)
 Godzilla: Save the Earth (Xbox, PS2 – 2004)
 Godzilla: Unleashed (Wii – 2007) – The Millennium version is exclusive in the Wii version.
 Godzilla: Unleashed (PS2 – 2007) – The Showa version is exclusive to the PlayStation 2 version.
 Godzilla: The Game (PS3, PS4)
 Godzilla Defense Force (2019)
 GigaBash (PS4, PS5)

Literature
 Godzilla at World's End (novel – 1998)
 Godzilla: Legends (comic; 2011–2012)
 Godzilla: Ongoing (comic – 2012)
 Godzilla: The Half-Century War (comic; 2012–2013)
 Godzilla: Rulers of Earth (comic; 2013–2015)
 Godzilla: Oblivion (comic – 2016)
 GODZILLA: Project Mechagodzilla (novel – 2018)

Music
 Gigan (a.k.a. Zymeer) is a rapper from hip-hop group Monsta Island Czars also featured on the Take Me to Your Leader album.
 Guitar virtuoso Buckethead wrote a song called "Gigan", as well as another named "Mecha Gigan". They appear on his 2006 albums The Elephant Man's Alarm Clock and Crime Slunk Scene.

Cultural references
 The character Ponygon from Zatch Bell has a toy that is similar in appearance to Gigan.
 In Billy & Mandy's Big Boogey Adventure, a monster similar in appearance to Gigan appears, living on Monster Island.
 In Sonic Riders: Zero Gravity there are two tracks called Gigan Rocks and Gigan Device. Each has a statue of a birdlike creature with a sharp beak, which looks similar to Gigan himself.

References

Bibliography
 
 

Godzilla characters
Extraterrestrial supervillains
Fictional cyborgs
Mothra characters
Fictional mummies
Fictional undead
Fictional characters with superhuman strength
Fictional characters who can move at superhuman speeds
Fictional monsters
Toho monsters
Kaiju
Science fiction film characters
Film characters introduced in 1972
Fictional extraterrestrial life forms
Horror film villains